The Cairn of Barnenez (also: Barnenez Tumulus, Barnenez Mound; in Breton Karn Barnenez; in French: Cairn de Barnenez or Tumulus de Barnenez) is a Neolithic monument located near Plouezoc'h, on the Kernéléhen peninsula in northern Finistère, Brittany (France). It dates to the early Neolithic, about 4800 BC. Along with the Tumulus of Bougon and Locmariaquer megaliths, also located in Great West France, it is one of the earliest megalithic monuments in Europe and one of the oldest man-made structures in the world. It is also remarkable for the presence of megalithic art.

History

Dates
Radiocarbon dates indicate that the first phase of the monument was erected between 4850 and 4250 BC, and the second phase between 4450 and 4000 BC.

Secondary use
Pottery found in and around the monument indicates that it underwent a period of reuse in the Bronze Age, in the 3rd millennium BC.

Recognition as an ancient monument
The cairn was first mapped in 1807, in the context of the Napoleonic cadaster. Its first scientific recognition took place in the context of an academic congress in Morlaix in 1850, when it was classified as a tumulus.

Quarry damage
Privately owned until the 1950s, the cairn was used as a quarry for paving stones. This activity, which threatened to destroy the monument, was only halted after the discovery of several of its chambers in the 1950s. The local community then took control of the site.

Restoration and excavation
The cairn was restored between 1954 and 1968. At the same time, vegetation was removed from the mound and systematic excavation took place in and around the monument.

The monument

The mound

Today, the Barnenez cairn is 72 m long, up to 25 m wide, and over 8 m high. It is built of 13,000 to 14,000 tons of stone. It contains 11 chambers entered by separate passages. The mound has steep facades and a stepped profile. Several internal walls either represent earlier facades or served the stability of the structure. The cairn consists of relatively small blocks of stone, with only the chambers being truly megalithic in character.
The monument overlooks the Bay of Morlaix, probably a fertile coastal plain at the time of its erection.

Construction phases
The monument is the result of at least two phases of building.

Cairn 1, before 4500 BC
In a first phase, a slightly trapezoidal mound of 32 m by 9 to 13 m was erected. It contained 5 chambers and was surrounded by a double kerb. The first phase favoured the use of dolerite.

Cairn 2, c. 4200 – c. 3900 BC
In a second phase, an extension with six further chambers was added in the west. At the same time, Cairn 1 was enveloped in a wider and taller structure; its passages had to be extended. More granite was used in this phase.

The chambers

The 11 chambers of the Barnenez cairn are of the type known as Dolmen à couloir in French archaeological terminology. The term translates roughly as "passage grave". They are built of large slabs of slate and granite. Originally, all the chambers were entirely enclosed by the mound. The fact that several of them are partially exposed now is the result of modern quarrying.

Each of the 11 chambers is reached from the southeast via a long narrow passage (7–12 m long). They are arranged parallel to each other. Shapes and construction techniques differ slightly.
 
In nine cases, narrow passages lead to corbelled chambers. Normally, the corbel vault rests on orthostats, in one chamber it actually sits on the ground, forming a true tholos. The passages have slab-built or dry stone walls and are covered with slabs. One of the chambers has a dry-stone vaulted ante-chamber.

Logistics 
One cubic metre of the Barnenez cairn contains 1,500 kg of stone. It is estimated that the quarrying, fashioning, transport and construction of such an amount represents about four work days for a single worker (assuming a 10-hour day). The original monument, Cairn 1, had a volume of about 2,000 cubic metres; it is built of 1,000 tons of granite and 3,000 tons of dolerite. It would thus have required 15,000 to 20,000 working days; in other words, it would have taken 200 workers three months to erect Cairn 1 alone. In its final form, the Barnenez mound is nearly three times as big as the first phase.

Engraved symbols
Engraved symbols occur in several of the chambers and passages. They depict bows, axes, wave symbols or snakes and a repeated U-shaped sign. One of the carved slabs is in secondary use; it was originally part of a different structure, an interesting parallel to the situation in several other such monuments, including Gavrinis.

The symbols on the engraved blocks resemble those found in other megalithic monuments in Brittany; in broader terms they belong to the cultural phenomenon described as megalithic art. One of the recurring symbols is sometimes interpreted as an anthropomorphic depiction (the so-called "Dolmen Goddess").

Finds

Material from the original period of use
Only Cairn 2, namely chambers A, C and D, contained Neolithic finds at the time of excavation. They included pottery, polished stone axes (of dolerite), flint blades and arrowheads.

Bronze Age pottery
Pottery shards found outside the monument indicate that it was reused in the Bronze Age (3rd millennium BC). A copper dagger and a barbed arrowhead are of Chalcolithic date.

Comparable monuments
Similar, possibly contemporary, monuments are known at 22 other locations in France and on Jersey. Breton examples are Larcuste-Colpo, Le Bono, Petit Mont, Ty-Floc´h, Gavrinis, Île Carn, Ploudalmézeau and Guennoc (I´ile Gaignoc – sometimes spelt Guénioc) off the shore at Landéda. Those located on islands are generally better preserved. Chamber 3 B at Guennoc contains a small standing stone near the entrance.

Exhibition
An exhibition in the modern entrance building explains the results of scientific excavation and displays some objects from the site.

See also
Megalithic art
Gavrinis
Bougon

Bibliography 
 Briard J. & Fediaevsky N.: Mégalithes de Bretagne 1987
 Charles-Tanguy Le Roux et Yannick Lecerf, Le grand cairn de Barnenez - Mausolée néolithique, Monum, Ed. du Patrimoine, coll. « Itinéraires du patrimoine », 2003

Sources of translation

References

External links 

 
French site with many images
Information on "The Megalithic Portal"

Buildings and structures completed in the 5th millennium BC
1807 archaeological discoveries
Neolithic
Archaeological sites in Brittany
Megalithic monuments in Brittany
Stone Age Europe
Prehistoric art
Buildings and structures in Finistère
Tourist attractions in Finistère
Monuments historiques of Finistère
Tumuli in France
Monuments of the Centre des monuments nationaux